The production, distribution, and sale of methamphetamine is restricted or illegal in many jurisdictions.

Legal status by country

Legality of similar chemicals
See ephedrine and pseudoephedrine for legal restrictions in place as a result of their use as precursors in the clandestine manufacture of methamphetamine.

References

Drug control law
Methamphetamine